WWNT is a Spanish language formatted broadcast radio station licensed to Winston-Salem, North Carolina, United States, serving Winston-Salem and Forsyth County, North Carolina. WWNT is owned by Mahan Janbakhsh's TBLC Holdings, LLC, through licensee TBLC Greensboro Stations, LLC. As of August 1, 2018, WWNT is silent.

History

1947 sign-on
The station began as WTOB, a 1,000-watt daytimer in 1947 on 710 kHz and licensed to Winston-Salem.

1950s-1970s: Top 40 days
By 1955, WTOB had moved to 1380 kHz, and upgraded from a daytime to a full-time station with 5,000 watts days and 1,000 watts night. It also had a sister television station: WTOB-TV.

WTOB was a Top 40 station during the 1950s, 1960s and 1970s. George Lee was one of "The Good Guys". Other popular DJs were Dick Bennick, The Flying Dutchman, and Rick Dees, who worked at WTOB, WCOG and WKIX when the stations were owned by Southern Broadcasting.

Shortly after his retirement in 2015 from WEGO, a Winston-Salem Journal story said that when Smith Patterson went to work at WTOB, his name was the same as John Johnson and he was told not to use that name. Several days later, he got behind a Patterson Smith oil truck and decided on the name he would use through his 45-year career.

1980s and '90s: changes in formats
In the 1980s, the station played adult standards in addition to airing local and regional sports events, talk programs such as Marge at Large, and other local content such as a barbershop music program. At the end of the 1980s, most of the station's music came from Satellite Radio Networks. The station later switched to CNN radio news. Truth Broadcasting eventually purchased the station and switched it to Christian talk, later airing the same programming as WCOG.

The 2000s: simulcasts and Spanish
On January 1, 2002, WWBG began airing the same programming as WTOB.

In 2003, Truth Broadcasting stopped selling time to La Movidita, which moved back to WSGH. Que Pasa moved from WSGH to WTOB and WWBG. This was done even though the Spring 2002 Arbitron results showed WTOB had its highest ratings since the change to Spanish programming. At some point not too long after this, Davidson Media purchased WTOB.

2010s: back to English and back to Spanish
On April 1, 2013, WTOB switched back to all-English, dropped all Spanish programming and flipped its format to Oldies (1950s-1970s and Carolina Beach Oldies). Jerry Holt leased the station from owner Davidson Media and was the general manager of WTOB as well as an on-air D.J. The station announced that it was moving its studios to 3rd Avenue in Winston-Salem. WTOB was based on the style and music that made it the top radio station in Winston-Salem in the 1960s and 1970s, and past jingles and sound effects were used. Among the disc jockeys were Curtis Lee, who was on WAIR in the 1960s.

Holt and Davidson Media could not agree on a new lease in 2014. WTOB was leased to Dan Williard, and Holt leased another station, WSMX. WTOB switched to a classic hits format on June 1. Speaking about the new format, program director Coyote Mush told the Winston-Salem Journal, "We’re the only station that does the Classic Hits format between Charlotte and Raleigh... Corporate radio has just ignored it."

In July 2015, TBLC Media purchased WTOB. In November 2015, TBLC changed the format to Spanish. The classic hits format remained on the station's website and moved first to WSMX and on December 18, 2015 at noon, to WEGO. Former WTOB employees formed Southern Broadcast Media LLC to license the new station.

On December 9, 2015, WTOB changed its callsign to WWNT. On November 15, 2016, TBLC Media consented to give the WTOB callsign to the owners of WEGO 980 AM, and as of November 22, 2016, WEGO became WTOB.

According to the FCC's Silent AM Broadcast Stations List, WWNT has been off the air since December 11, 2020.

WTOB-TV
A sister television station, WTOB-TV, signed on the air on September 18, 1953. It was an ABC and DuMont affiliate. WTOB-TV operated on Channel 26. As with many early UHF stations, it faced signal problems and the fact that viewers had to purchase expensive UHF converters to see the signal. With the area already served by strong VHF stations like Greensboro’s WFMY-TV and Winston-Salem’s WSJS-TV, WTOB-TV was fighting a difficult battle. It signed off in 1957. Channel 26 now is WUNL-TV, the University of North Carolina television station serving Winston-Salem. It is not affiliated with WTOB.

Previous logo

References

External links
 WWNT on Facebook

 FCC History Cards for WWNT

WNT
Radio stations established in 1947
1947 establishments in North Carolina
WNT